Summer Jamboree is an international music festival focused on the culture and music of the 1940s and 1950s. The summer event takes place in the city of Senigallia.

Description 
The event, which has taken place every year since 2000, is planned and organized by the culture association Summer Jamboree and is promoted with the support of the municipality of Senigallia. The festival usually starts on the last weekend of July and lasts a week. It involves the entire city: cafes, squares and other public places (Piazza del Duca, the Rotonda). The name is translated as "party gathering" or "good times"; the origin of the English word jamboree is unknown.

History 
The first edition, in 2000, lasted only one day with the performance of four musical groups. The following year saw a larger program. In 2002 the festival started receiving media attention and became better known across Italy. The 2003 edition established the Summer Jamboree among the top three events of its kind in Italy. In 2005 the festival attracted around 100,000 people during the seven days of the event and the three days of the prefestival; the final evening was attended by 40,000 people. The 2015 edition, during the 10 days of the event, counted about 400,000 admissions, while the 2017 edition lasted twelve days and recorded an attendance of 420,000. The presence of 400,000 spectators in the 2018 edition confirmed the popularity of the event.

Music 
During the seven days of the festival, there are a lot of live concerts and DJ sets with swing, rock and roll, jive, doo-wop, rhythm and blues, hillbilly and western swing. There are dance lessons too. Among the artists who performed at the festival there were Billy Lee Riley (US), Big Jay Mac Neely (US), Sid & Billy King (US), Huelyn Duvall (US), Charlie Gracie (US), Ray Campi (US), Pep Torres (US), Wee Willie Harris (UK), Danny & The Juniors (US), Barrence Whitfield (US), Bill Haley's Original Comets (US), Good Fellas (ITA), Hormonauts (ITA/SCO), Jimmy Cavallo (US) and Stray Cats (USA).

References 
 Alfonso Napolitano, I fotografi del Summer Jamboree, [S.l.] : Rem, 2015. - 143 p. : ill., fot. ; 30 cm.

External links 

Music festivals in Italy